Meurchin is a commune in the Pas-de-Calais department in the Hauts-de-France region of France.

Geography

Population

Places of interest
 The church of St.Peter, rebuilt along with most of the town, after the First World War.
 The German military cemetery.

See also
Communes of the Pas-de-Calais department

References

External links

 A website about Meurchin and environs 
 Official town website 
 Website of the friends of the town of Meurchin 

Communes of Pas-de-Calais
Artois